Soo Bee Lee (May 9, 1934 – August 31, 2005) was a soprano singer from Singapore. She traveled to England in 1955 to study at the Royal Academy of Music. She was a gold medallist at the academy and had many roles on stage, notably at Glyndebourne and Sadler's Wells; and on television and radio in England and abroad. She also appeared in Aladdin at The London Coliseum in 1960, and on BBC TV's The Good Old Days.

References 

1934 births
2005 deaths
Alumni of the Royal Academy of Music
English sopranos
Singaporean emigrants to the United Kingdom
English people of Singaporean descent
20th-century English singers
20th-century English women singers